Haqeeqat may refer to:

 Haqeeqat (1964 film), a 1964 Hindi film
 Haqeeqat (1985 film), a 1985 Indian Bollywood film
 Haqeeqat (1995 film), a 1995 Indian Bollywood film
 Haqeeqat (Indian TV series), an Indian television docudrama series
 Haqeeqat (2019 TV series), a Pakistani anthology television series
 Haqeeqat (book), the Hindi translation of a controversial book by M. G. Mathew

See also
Haqiqa or haqiqa, truth or reality in Sufism